Elophila is a genus of moths of the family Crambidae described by Jacob Hübner in 1822.

Species
Elophila acornutus Agassiz, 2012
Elophila africalis (Hampson, 1906)
Elophila aristodora (Turner, 1908)
Elophila atlantica (Munroe, 1972)
Elophila bourgognei Leraut, 2001
Elophila difflualis (Snellen, 1880)
Elophila ealensis (Agassiz, 2012)
Elophila ekthlipsis (Grote, 1876)
Elophila faulalis (Walker, 1859)
Elophila feili Speidel, 2002
Elophila fengwhanalis (Pryer, 1877)
Elophila fluvialis (Schaus, 1912)
Elophila fulvalis (Hampson, 1899)
Elophila gurgitalis (Lederer, 1863)
Elophila gyralis (Hulst, 1886)
Elophila icciusalis (Walker, 1859)
Elophila interruptalis (Pryer, 1877)
Elophila manilensis (Hampson, 1917)
Elophila maralis (Schaus, 1920)
Elophila melagynalis (D. J. L. Agassiz, 1978)
Elophila melanolepis (Hampson, 1919)
Elophila minima Agassiz, 2012
Elophila minimalis (Saalmüller, 1880)
Elophila minoralis (Mabille, 1881)
Elophila monetalis (Snellen, 1880)
Elophila nebulosalis (Fernald, 1887)
Elophila nigralbalis (Caradja, 1925)
Elophila nigrolinealis (Pryer, 1877)
Elophila nuda F.Q. Chen, C.S. Wu & D.Y. Xue, 2010
Elophila nymphaeata Linnaeus, 1758– brown china-mark 
Elophila obliteralis (Walker, 1859)
Elophila occidentalis (Lange, 1956)
Elophila orientalis (Filipjev, 1933)
Elophila palliolatalis (Swinhoe, 1890)
Elophila radiospinula F.Q. Chen, C.S. Wu & D.Y. Xue, 2010
Elophila responsalis (Walker, 1866)
Elophila rivulalis Duponchel, 1834
Elophila roesleri Speidel, 1984
Elophila rosetta (Meyrick, 1938)
Elophila scitalis (Swinhoe, 1885)
Elophila separatalis (Leech, 1889)
Elophila serralinealis (Barnes & Benjamin, 1924)
Elophila sinicalis (Hampson, 1897)
Elophila tenebralis (Lower, 1902)
Elophila tinealis (Munroe, 1972)
Elophila turbata (Butler, 1881)

References

  2010: A review of the genus Elophila Hübner, 1822 in China (Lepidoptera: Crambidae: Acentropinae). Aquatic Insects 32 (1): 35-60. .
 , 1999: Catalogue of the Oriental Acentropinae (Lepidoptera: Crambidae). Tijdschrift voor Entomologie 142 (1): 125-142.
  1985: A systematic study of the Nymphulinae and the Musotiminae of Japan (Lepidoptera: Pyralidae). Scientific Reports of the Kyoto Prefectural University Agriculture, Kyoto 37: 1–162.

External links
Genus Elophila on Fauna Europaea

Acentropinae
Crambidae genera
Taxa named by Jacob Hübner